The 2002–03 UNC Wilmington Seahawks men's basketball team represented the University of North Carolina Wilmington during the 2002–03 NCAA Division I men's basketball season. The Seahawks, led by first-year head coach Brad Brownell, played their home games at the Trask Coliseum and were members of the Colonial Athletic Association (CAA).

After finishing atop the CAA regular season standings, the Seahawks won the CAA tournament to receive an automatic bid to the NCAA tournament as No. 11 seed in the South region. After leading No. 6 seed Maryland late in the game, the Seahawks' hearts were broken when Drew Nicholas hit a buzzer-beater for Maryland.

Senior shooting guard Brett Blizzard repeated as CAA Player of the Year and an AP Honorable Mention All-American.

Roster

Schedule and results

|-
!colspan=9 style=| Regular season

|-
!colspan=9 style=| CAA tournament

|-
!colspan=9 style=| NCAA tournament

Rankings

Awards and honors
Brett Blizzard – AP Honorable Mention All-American, CAA Player of the Year, CAA tournament MVP

References

UNC Wilmington Seahawks men's basketball seasons
Unc Wilmington
Unc Wilmington